Clăbucetul Taurului ("the bull's cap") is a mountain in Romania, part of Baiu Mountains in the Southern Carpathians.

Located on the border of Brașov and Prahova counties, it is in the vicinity of Predeal, and features rich pastures. In 1844, the mountain was purchased by Alecu Filipescu-Vulpea. Pursuant to a deed issued by Prince Gheorghe Bibescu Filipescu granted it to Predeal Monastery later that year. It remained with the monastery until the 1863 secularization of monastic estates in Romania. Near the end of the 19th century, it passed to the crown domains, established in 1884.

Notes

References
Paulina Brătescu, Ion Moruzi, C. Alessandrescu (eds.), Dicționar geografic al județului Prahova. Târgoviște: Tipografia și Legătoria de Cărți Viitorul, Elie Angelescu, 1897.  

Mountains of Romania
Geography of Prahova County
Geography of Brașov County
Mountains of the Southern Carpathians